Anathallis acuminata is a species of orchid plant native to Peru.

References 

acuminata
Flora of Peru
Plants described in 2001